Memento Mori (1993) is a composition for orchestra by Peter Sculthorpe. The title refers to the medieval Christian idea of memento mori, and the piece itself makes frequent references to the plainchant setting of the Latin hymn "Dies irae".

Conception 
Laurie Strachan wrote in The Australian, when reviewing the piece on October 22, 1993, that "[t]he work was inspired by a visit to Easter Island, famous for its great stone heads, monuments that can be seen as both an example of the indomitable nature of the human spirit and as part of its great folly - for their making and transportation deforested and impoverished the island."<ref name=faber1085>{{Cite web|url=http://www.fabermusic.com/news/memento-mori-reviews-1085|title=Memento Mori''' reviews|website=www.fabermusic.com|access-date=2018-02-14}}</ref> When composing, Memento Mori, Sculthorpe focused on the link between 'the personal notion of morality' and the 'extended environmental sense of fragility', using 'Easter Island as a parable for planet Earth and population growth'.

In the original programme notes, the composer described the way he conceived of the work:

 Reception 
The work has received mixed reviews. Joseph McLellan, writing in The Washington Post, stated that:
Laurie Strachan, writing in The Australian, was similarly positive, writing that Memento Mori was 'one of [Sculthorpe's] most immediately appealing scores.' Strachan went on further to say that '[t]here are some hauntingly beautiful melodies and striking tonal contrasts. Some play is made of the plainchant Dies irae but this is not overdone and the whole thing ends on a note of quiet resolution that's absolutely right.’

Conversely, Andrew Clements, while reviewing a CD of Sculthorpe's work for The Guardian, said that the Memento Mori was "the most conventional and least effective piece on [the] disc".

 Instrumentation 
The music is scored for two flutes (flute 2 doubling piccolo), two clarinets, two oboes, two bassoons, four horns, four trumpets, two trombones, bass trombone, tuba, timpani, percussion (two players), and strings.

 Form Memento Mori is in one movement and last for approximately 14 minutes. It is in common time and the tempo is lento. The piece opens with an introduction, which them leads into two statements of the Dies irae plainchant, part of the Latin mass for the dead:

Following this, the music oscillates between the pitches of G and A-flat. The composer notes that this is because the astronomer Kepler believed those pitches to be the sound of the planet Earth. Then there a further two statements of the Dies irae'' plainchant, by which the music reaches a solemn climax, followed by more somber music.

Commission and performance 
The work was commissioned by the ABC for performance by West Australian Symphony Orchestra. It was first performed by the West Australian Symphony Orchestra, with Jorge Mester conducting, on July 2, 1993, in the Perth Concert Hall. It has subsequently been performed several times, most recently by the Queensland Conservatorium Symphony Orchestra, with Peter Morris conducting, on March 27, 2015.

References 

Compositions by Peter Sculthorpe
Compositions for symphony orchestra
Death in music
1993 compositions